Dehnow-e Avarzaman (also Romanized as Dehnow-e Āvarzamān and Deh Now-ye Āvar Zamān; also known as Deh Now) is a village in Haram Rud-e Sofla Rural District, Samen District, Malayer County, Hamadan Province, Iran. At the 2006 census, its population was 1,609, in 446 families.

References 

Populated places in Malayer County